Daniel Cassiau-Haurie (born 21 February 1961) is a French weightlifter. He competed in the men's middleweight event at the 1984 Summer Olympics.

References

1961 births
Living people
French male weightlifters
Olympic weightlifters of France
Weightlifters at the 1984 Summer Olympics
Place of birth missing (living people)